Karagashli may refer to:
 Karagash, a Turkic people
Qaraqaşlı (disambiguation), places in Azerbaijan